The Liberal Democratic Party (XO) is a political party in Iceland founded by Guðmundur Franklín Jónsson in 2020. Their slogan is "Investors, projects and producers". The party has the list letter O.

On October 14, 2020, Guðmundur Franklín Jónsson, an economist, announced that he intended to form a new political party that would run in the 2021 parliamentary election. On February 10, 2021, the candidacy was confirmed and announced. The party ran in the parliamentary election on September 25, 2021, and won no seats.

Electoral results

References 

Political parties established in 2020
Classical liberal parties
Eurosceptic parties in Iceland
Nationalist parties in Iceland